Robert Piercey is a Canadian philosopher and Professor of Philosophy at Campion College, University of Regina. He is the editor of Philosophy in Review.
Piercey is known for his works on continental philosophy.

Books
 Reading as a Philosophical Practice. Anthem Press, 2020.
 The Uses of the Past From Heidegger to Rorty: Doing Philosophy Historically. Cambridge University Press, 2009.
The Crisis in Continental Philosophy: History, Truth and the Hegelian Legacy. Continuum, 2009.

References

External links
Robert Piercey

21st-century Canadian philosophers
Philosophy academics
Living people
Continental philosophers
University of Notre Dame alumni
Alumni of the University of Warwick
Memorial University of Newfoundland alumni
Academic staff of the University of Regina
Heidegger scholars
Year of birth missing (living people)